Your Turn to Fall is the seventh Jandek album, and was released as Corwood 0745. It was reissued on CD in 2001.

Overview 

Your Turn to Fall marks something of a transition in Corwood history, for several reasons. For one, drums again appear on "John Plays Drums." Curiously, this turns out to be the same song sung by Nancy on "Nancy Sings" from Chair Beside a Window and which appears in a more standard acoustic/vocal form as "Birthday" from The Rocks Crumble. Here the principal artist plucks the guitar and sings, while one "John" plays the drums, something he doesn't seem to have done before, though the shambling rhythm produced fits the Jandek music style.

The rest of the album is, in a way, the end of an era. This is the seventh and final album in what might be considered Jandek's "first acoustic phase," and the remaining fifteen tracks build on the solo avant-blues of the prior four albums. Here Jandek steps more fully into the Delta sound of Charley Patton, though the songs are still picked on strings tuned to a peculiar "black key" sound accessible only to the player. He's also working on his voice, which uses more range here than on any Jandek release before it. Tracks like "If Your Fortune Fails You" (which echoes "First You Think Your Fortune's Lovely" from Ready for the House) and the opening "Liquids Flow to the Sea" feature very controlled, and often menacing performances. From here the focus would be on band material, a phase which culminates in 1991's Lost Cause and "The Electric End."

Track listing

References

External links 
Seth Tisue's Your Turn to Fall review

Jandek albums
Corwood Industries albums
1983 albums